Oscar Salvador Vera Anguiano (born 10 March 1986) is a former Mexican footballer who last played as a midfielder for Veracruz.

Career

Youth career
Vera started his career in 2005 with Alacranes de Durango briefly. Until he joined Atlas Youth Academy in 2007. Jorge Castañeda was the coach that promoted Vera to the first team.

Club Atlas
Vera joined Atlas youth academy at a young age. Until finally on September 22, 2007, he made his debut against Chiapas F.C. which ended in a 1–0 loss.

Veracruz
Vera become the new signing for Veracruz coming from Leones Negro. Carlos Reinoso being the new signing for the Clausura 2015.

References

External links

1986 births
Living people
Footballers from Guanajuato
Liga MX players
Leones Negros UdeG footballers
C.D. Veracruz footballers
Mexican footballers
Association football midfielders